is a Japanese singer-songwriter.

As of August 2013, she has released nine singles and three albums. Her second major album,  was released on September 25, 2013.

Personal life
Saori Atsumi was born and raised in Iwata, Shizuoka. When she was young, her mother used to sing lullabies to her and use the organ during her kindergarten lessons; this had a lot of influence for her interest in music. She admired Tsuyoshi Nagabuchi and decided to take up the guitar during middle school. During high school, she started to write music.

She designed the cover of her self-produced single. Her official site features the cover of her latest single, Namida no Riyū. This became evident when the singer participated in a charity event and contributed a tote bag featuring her artwork on it.

Career
Before her commercial debut, she often did live in-house performances at different places such as Apia in Shibuya, Tokyo as well in-store performances at various Tower Records stores.

She self-produced a cassette that contains two songs in October 1999 titled Mayonaka no Radio. The title track was later included in her first self-produced CD titled Tasogare Ryūseigun with an acoustic version of it. The CD was released on July 27, 2002.

Then she officially debuted with her single, "Mōsukoshi… Mōsukoshi…" as the ending theme of Midori Days in 2004. Later in November, she released her second major single, "Bīdama". The title track became the ending theme for the anime series Genshiken. The single contains a hidden track titled . It is a cover version of a song by Magokoro Brothers.

On Christmas Day that year, she also released her first album under an independent label, B-gram Records, titled Anata to Watashi to Kimi to Boku. Her second album Sora Iro Nostalgie was released in April 2006. Her third major single, "Ai", was released, and the title track was opening theme for the 2006 remake of the series Kujibiki Unbalance. It also contained her cover of Kazuyoshi Saito's Tatoeba Kimi no Koto

It was not until 2007 that she released her first major album. Tokyo Cramzy Days, which was released on March 21, also contains a few tracks from her other major singles as well as her other independent albums. Except for her three singles, her albums never went on the Oricon charts.

Her latest releases "Suki ni Naritai" and "Namida no Riyū" are exclusively available on iTunes Music Store. They are released under her independent label. Her first digital single, "Aoi Sora ga Mienai" was released on April 11, 2006, and was only available in Indie Rise. The single is from her second independent album, Sora Iro no Nostalgie.

She does live in-house performances as well as being a part of the Tote as Canvas Charity Event with Masao Kida, Maroon 5 along with other celebrities.

Collaborations 
Besides writing and performing her own songs, she has composed and written songs for other artistes. She also composed the music for 'Tears and January 28 ~two of us~ in Aya Kamiki's independent mini album, Rock On.

 Discography 
 Singles 
 , released May 26, 2004.
 , released November 26, 2004.
 , released October 25, 2006.
 , released August 11, 2010.

 Albums 
 Tokyo Cramzy Days, released March 21, 2007.
 , released on September 25, 2013.

 Albums on independent labels 
 , released December 25, 2004.
 , released April 26, 2006.

Source:

 Digital singles 
 
 
 
 
 

Source:

 Self-produced CDs 
 
 

 Compilations 
 Neo Generation Vol.1 Tears...for truth Yunosagi Relations Ika Love''

References

External links 
  
 Saori Atsumi at Lantis 
 Saori Atsumi at Twitter 
 Saori Atsumi at Oricon
 Saori Atsumi at Neo Generation 
 Saori Atsumi at MusicBrainz

1989 births
Anime musicians
Being Inc. artists
Japanese women singer-songwriters
Japanese women pop singers
Lantis (company) artists
Living people
Musicians from Shizuoka Prefecture
20th-century Japanese women singers
20th-century Japanese singers
21st-century Japanese women singers
21st-century Japanese singers